David Armand (born 1977) is an English comedian.

David Armand may also refer to:
David Armand (author) (born 1980), American novelist

See also
Armand David, missionary and botanist